Boyan Petkanchin (April 8, 1907 – March 3, 1987) was a prominent Bulgarian mathematician, working in geometry and foundation of mathematics.  As a first chairman of the Department of Mathematical Logic at the Bulgarian Academy of Sciences he worked to promote and disseminate the knowledge of mathematical logic both in the professional mathematical community in Bulgaria and as popular science.

External links
 Historical notes on the development of mathematical logic in Sofia

1907 births
1987 deaths
Bulgarian logicians
20th-century Bulgarian mathematicians
20th-century Bulgarian philosophers